Costa, sometimes Costas, da Costa, Da Costa, or Dalla Costa, is an Italian, Spanish, Portuguese, and French surname. The surname spread throughout the world through colonization. It is also a surname chosen by Jews and other religious groups due to Roman Catholic and other Christian conversions.

In Italy, Portugal, Galicia and Catalonia it is derived from the Latin word costa, "rib", which has come to mean slope, coast, in Romance languages. In the rest of Spain it comes from Catalonia or from Galicia, being the Spanish equivalent Cuesta.

Geographical distribution
As of 2014, 71.0% of all known bearers of the surname Costa were residents of Brazil (frequency 1:141), 7.6% of Portugal (1:67), 5.2% of Mozambique (1:255), 3.7% of Italy (1:801), 2.4% of the United States (1:7,460), 1.9% of Guinea-Bissau (1:44), 1.5% of Spain (1:1,531), 1.2% of East Timor (1:49) and 1.2% of Argentina (1:1,809).

In Brazil, the frequency of the surname was higher than national average (1:141) in the following states:
Maranhão (1:46)
Amapá (1:60)
Pará (1:74)
Roraima (1:77)
Acre (1:93)
Rio Grande do Norte (1:97)
Amazonas (1:98)
Ceará (1:112)
Bahia (1:112)
Tocantins (1:113)
Sergipe (1:117)
Piauí (1:119)
Paraíba (1:120)
Alagoas (1:131)
Federal District (1:131)
Minas Gerais (1:140)

In Italy, the frequency of the surname was higher than national average (1:801) in the following regions:
Liguria (1:214)
Sicily (1:374)
Piedmont (1:458)
Veneto (1:489)
Emilia-Romagna (1:676)
Trentino-Alto Adige/Südtirol (1:763)
Lombardy (1:784)

In Spain, the frequency of the surname was higher than national average (1:1,531) in the following autonomous communities:
Balearic Islands (1:399)
Catalonia (1:667)
Galicia (1:672)
Region of Murcia (1:845)
Valencian Community (1:1,001)

People

Afonso Costa, (1871–1937),  Portuguese Prime Minister 1913-17
Albert Costa, Catalan tennis player
Alberto Costa, multiple people
Aldo Costa, Italian Engineering Director of the Mercedes Formula One team 
Alfredo Costa, (1874–1913), Italian operatic baritone
Alfredo Bruto da Costa, (1938–2016), Portuguese politician of Goan descent
Alfredo Luís da Costa (1883–1908), Portuguese publicist, editor, journalist and assassin
Alfredo Nobre da Costa, (1923 - 1996), Português politician who also had Goan Konkani, Italian, French, and Danish ancestry, Prime Minister of Portugal from 28 August 1978 – 22 November 1978
Andrea Costa, Italian socialist activist
António Costa, current Portuguese prime-minister
António Félix da Costa, Portuguese racing driver
Antonio da Costa Santos, Brazilian architect and politician
Antony Costa, British singer
Asitha Costa, Sri Lankan cricketer
Beatriz da Costa, interdisciplinary artist
Benjamin Mendes da Costa (1803–68), English-Australian philanthropist
Bob Costas, American sports journalist
Carles Costa, Catalan tennis player
Carlos Duarte Costa, Brazilian religious figure
Catherine da Costa (1679–1756), Anglo-Jewish miniaturist
Celso Costa, Brazilian mathematician, discovered Costa's minimal surface, an embedded minimal surface in 1982
Costa (footballer) (born 1973), Portuguese footballer, full name João Carlos Rodrigues da Costa
Dave Costa (1941–2013), American football player
Dave Costa (offensive lineman) (born 1978), American football player
Delfim Moreira da Costa Ribeiro, Brazilian politician
Desiderio Costa, Angolan politician
Diego Costa, Spanish-Brazilian footballer
Dino Costa, American radio personality
Don Costa, American pop music arranger and record producer
Douglas Costa, Brazilian footballer playing for Juventus, winger
Emanuel Mendes da Costa, English botanist, naturalist, philosopher, and collector
Erminio Costa, Italian-born neuroscientist
Fabio Costa,  Brazilian goalkeeper
Fortunatus Victor Costa (18th/19th centuries), minor Maltese philosopher
Francesco Costa, Italian painter
Frank Costa,  Australian businessman and Geelong Football Club President
Gal Costa, Brazilian singer
George Da Costa (1853–1929), a Nigerian photographer
 Giacamo Costa (1919–2000), Italian-born Australian professional wrestler better known as Al Costello
Giovanni Costa, Italian painter
Hélder Costa, Portuguese winger for Leeds United
Isaac da Costa, Dutch Jewish writer
Jason Costa, mixed martial artist from mississauga Ontario
Jaume Costa, Valencian footballer
Jay Costa, American politician
Jean-Paul Costa, French judge
Jim Costa, Portuguese-American politician
Joan Costa-i-Font, Catalan economist
Joan da Costa, court jester
Joaquim Costa Puig, Catalan basketball player
Joe Costa, Australian footballer
Johnny Costa, American jazz pianist
John P. Costas, American Engineer
John P. Costas, American Businessman
Jon Costas, American Politician 
Jorge Costa, Portuguese football player
Joseph Costa, Luso-American aviation pioneer
Kitty da Costa, (1710–1747)
Larissa Costa, Brazilian model
Leonardo Costa (born 2008), German chess master
Ligia Maura Costa, Brazilian professor
Lorenzo Costa, Italian painter
Lúcio Costa, Brazilian architect and urban planner
Luís Antônio Corréa da Costa (born 1966), Brazilian footballer better known as Müller
Manuel da Costa, Portuguese footballer
Manuel da Costa, Portuguese jesuit missionary
Manuel Pinto da Costa, former president of São Tomé and Príncipe
Marcello Costa (born 1940), Italian-born Australian medical doctor, researcher, and public health advocate. 
Marcos Costa, Brazilian boxer
Maria do Céu Sarmento Pina da Costa, East Timorese politician
Mariana Bridi da Costa, known as "Mari", Brazilian model
Mario Costa (diplomat), a Maltese diplomat and ambassador to Russia
Martinho da Costa Lopes, East Timorese religious and political leader
Mathieu de Costa, first recorded black person in Canada
Mary Costa, American singer and actress
Matt Costa, American folk singer and songwriter
Sir Michael Costa, English composer and conductor
Michael Costa, Australian politician
Moses Costa (1950–2020), Bangladeshi Roman Catholic prelate
Moses da Costa, also called "Anthony da Costa", English banker
Newton da Costa, Brazilian mathematician
Nikka Costa, American singer
Nuccio Costa, Italian television presenter
Orazio Costa, Italian theatre pedagogist and director
Oronzio Gabriele Costa, Italian zoologist
Paolo Costa, Italian Member of the European Parliament
Paulo Henrique Costa, UFC Fighter
Phil Costa, Australian politician
Philippe Da Costa
Rebecca Da Costa, model, actress
Renata Aparecida da Costa, aka Renata Costa, Brazilian footballer
Rex De Costa, Sri Lankan doctor and soldier
Robert Costa (disambiguation), multiple people
Ronaldo da Costa, Brazilian long-distance runner
Rui Costa, Portuguese football player
Sagarika Da Costa, Indian-Italian singer and actress.
Sam Costa, British popular singer
Stéphane Da Costa, French-Polish professional ice hockey player
Tony Costa (1944-1974), American serial killer
Troy Costa, Indian fashion designer.
Uriel da Costa, Portuguese Jewish writer
Viviane Costa, Brazilian water polo player
Wimal Kumara de Costa, Sri Lankan actor
William P. Costas, an American businessman and politician.
Yamandu Costa, Brazilian guitarist and composer

Fictional characters
Manassseh da Costa, The King of Schnorrers

Dalla Costa
 Marco Dalla Costa (born 1988), an Italian footballer
 Elia Dalla Costa (1872-1961), an Italian cardinal
 Lamberto Dalla Costa (1920-1982), an Italian bobsledder
 Mariarosa Dalla Costa (born 1943), an Italian writer
 Andrea Dalla Costa (born 1974), an Italian visual artist and film maker

See also
Costa (disambiguation)

References

Galician-language surnames
Portuguese-language surnames
Italian-language surnames
Spanish-language surnames
Catalan-language surnames
Surnames of South Tyrolean origin